The McNamara Alumni Center at the University of Minnesota's Twin Cities campus in Minneapolis, Minnesota. Designed by Antoine Predock, it is one of the more architecturally striking buildings in the Twin Cities.  The building, opened in 2000, contains two main components: University office space and 10 meeting rooms for University and public use. The University owns the land, but the University of Minnesota Gateway Corporation, consisting of the U of M Foundation and U of M Alumni Association, owns the structure.

Overview 

Located at the intersection of University Avenue and Oak Street SE (200 SE Oak St, Minneapolis, MN 55414), the landmark building occupies land formerly home to Memorial Stadium and its interior features an arch that was once an entrance to the stadium. The building opened in February 2000 and is named for Richard McNamara, a 1956 alumnus of the university and former Gopher football player.

Architect Antoine Predock was chosen in 1996 to design the structure. KKE Architects of Minneapolis served as the project's executive architect and general manager. About  of copper clads the rectangular portion where university offices are located, including those of the University of Minnesota Alumni Association. Some 2,200 rose-colored granite blocks weighing up to  each form the geode's exterior. The structure required  of granite.

With ten versatile rooms, all on the first floor, the center is a popular Minneapolis conference, gala and wedding reception venue. In 2015 more than 750 meetings and events were held here. Voted Best Meeting Venue by Minnesota Meetings & Events magazine 2007 to 2012, McNamara has many conveniences, including tunnel connections to an adjacent 500-car parking ramp and hotel, quick highway access and award-winning D’Amico Catering onsite.

The rental demand for special event spaces at the center and growth in operations of the University of Minnesota Foundation and the University of Minnesota Alumni Association, both housed in the center, prompted the University of Minnesota Board of Regents to approve a $9.7 million expansion. The addition, designed by Predock, included office and event space as well as an expanded restaurant. Construction began in 2009 to coincide with the opening of the adjacent TCF Bank Stadium with funding provided by the ownership consortium.  The addition was completed in 2010 and created an additional  of space allowing for improved traffic flow in the building and reducing foot traffic through events, specifically in Memorial Hall.

References

External links
 
 

Buildings and structures in Minneapolis
University of Minnesota
Antoine Predock buildings